Yuri Alvear Orejuela (born 29 March 1986) is a Colombian judoka, three times World Champion in her division.

Early life
Yuri was born in Jamundí which is a suburb of Cali, the third largest city in Colombia. Her father Arnuy is a builder and mother Miryam is a housewife. She also has a brother, Harvy.

From youth, she was very talented in all kind of sports, she participated in water polo, volleyball, handball, athletics. When she was 14 Ruperto Guaúña, a judo trainer of Litecom school, was looking for girls for his judo team. That's how Yuri became a judoka.

Yuri began judo late, but she already was already in good physical condition from previous sport so she just needed to learn technical aspects of judo.

She is a very good friend with other top Colombian judoka Anny Cortez. She is also her sparring partner.

Judo career
Alvear won a bronze medal in the under 57 kg division of the 2006 Central American and Caribbean Games.

In 2008, she participated in the Olympic Games in Beijing where she placed 7th.  She lost to Anaysi Hernández of Cuba in the main draw and then lost a very close match against Leire Iglesias from Spain in the repechage losing her chance to fight for a medal.

In 2009, she won the World Championships in Rotterdam.  In the final she gained victory over Anett Mészáros from Hungary and became the third South American judoka to win the title, following Natasha Hernández (of Venezuela) in 1984 and Daniela Krukower (of Argentina) in 2003.

Two weeks before the 2010 Pan American Judo Championships, after training she felt some pain in her left knee. She went to doctor and he found that she had a torn ACL.

In 2012, she won a bronze medal at the Olympic Games in London, beating Chen Fei of China. This was the first ever Olympic medal for Colombia in Judo.

In 2016, she returned to the Olympic games in Rio and won a silver medal, becoming the 5th Colombian athlete to win two Olympic medals.

Achievements

All results referenced in her JudoInside profile.

References

External links
 
 Worldjudo2014.ru

1986 births
Living people
People from Jamundí
Colombian female judoka
Judoka at the 2008 Summer Olympics
Judoka at the 2011 Pan American Games
Olympic judoka of Colombia
Judoka at the 2012 Summer Olympics
Olympic silver medalists for Colombia
Olympic bronze medalists for Colombia
Olympic medalists in judo
Medalists at the 2012 Summer Olympics
Medalists at the 2016 Summer Olympics
Pan American Games silver medalists for Colombia
Pan American Games bronze medalists for Colombia
Judoka at the 2016 Summer Olympics
Pan American Games medalists in judo
South American Games gold medalists for Colombia
South American Games bronze medalists for Colombia
South American Games medalists in judo
Competitors at the 2006 South American Games
Competitors at the 2010 South American Games
Competitors at the 2014 South American Games
Competitors at the 2018 South American Games
Judoka at the 2019 Pan American Games
Central American and Caribbean Games bronze medalists for Colombia
Central American and Caribbean Games medalists in judo
Competitors at the 2006 Central American and Caribbean Games
Medalists at the 2011 Pan American Games
Medalists at the 2019 Pan American Games
Sportspeople from Valle del Cauca Department
21st-century Colombian women